Omega Virginis (ω Vir, ω Virginis) is a solitary star in the zodiac constellation Virgo. It has an apparent visual magnitude of +5.2, which is bright enough to be faintly visible to the naked eye. Based upon an annual stellar parallax shift of 6.56 milliarcseconds, it is located about 500 light years from the Sun.

This is a red giant star with a stellar classification of M4 III.  It is thought to be on the asymptotic giant branch (AGB), with shells of hydrogen and helium around a carbon-oxygen core.  After evolving away from the main sequence it has expanded to around 70 times the solar radius, and now shines with 1,515 times the luminosity of the Sun. The effective temperature of the outer atmosphere is 3,490 K.

Omega Virginis is a semiregular variable with a brightness that varies over an amplitude of 0.28 with periods of 30 and 275 days.  The General Catalogue of Variable Stars gives the magnitude range as 5.23 to 5.50.  It was formally declared a variable star in 1972 following a 1969 study showing small-amplitude variations.

References

Semiregular variable stars
M-type giants
Virgo (constellation)
Virginis, Omega
Virginis, 001
056779
4483
101153
Durchmusterung objects